Talula's Table is a small gourmet market and restaurant in Kennett Square, Pennsylvania. During the day, Talula's Table is a gourmet coffee shop and market. At night, Talulas's Table turns into a restaurant containing only two tables. It is known as the hardest reservation to get in the US. With only two tables: one that seats from 8 to 12 people and a "nook table" that seats from 4 to 8 people, reservations are taken every day for one year from that date.

Saveur magazine named Talula's number 52 on their 2010 Top 100 Restaurants listing.

References

External links 
 Official website

Restaurants in Pennsylvania
Tourist attractions in Chester County, Pennsylvania
Buildings and structures in Chester County, Pennsylvania
Cuisine of the Mid-Atlantic states